Long Branch is a stream in Lewis and Marion County in the U.S. state of Missouri. It is a tributary of Troublesome Creek.

Long Branch has the name of T. C. Long, the original owner of the site.

See also
List of rivers of Missouri

References

Rivers of Lewis County, Missouri
Rivers of Marion County, Missouri
Rivers of Missouri